Lelio Lagorio (9 November 1925 – 6 January 2017) was an Italian politician who served as the first President of Tuscany from 1970 until 1978.

Biography
Lagorio was born in Trieste and was a member of the Italian Socialist Party (Partito Socialista Italiano, PSI). He was mayor of Florence from 1964 to 1965, succeeding Giorgio La Pira, and, later, the first president of the Tuscany region (1970–1978).

He was the first PSI politicians to become Minister of Defence in Italy (1980–1983); the Ustica Massacre occurred under his tenure. Later he was minister of Sport and Spectales  (1983–1986), President of PSI's Deputies and at the European Parliament  (1986–1994) and  vice-president of the Union of European Community Socialist Parties (1990–1992).

Lagorio also wrote political and historical essays (including L'Ora di Austerlitz, about his period as Minister of Defence), and edited the Florentine magazine  Città & Regione.

Sources

1925 births
2017 deaths
Presidents of Tuscany
Politicians from Trieste
Italian Socialist Party politicians
Italian Ministers of Defence
Mayors of Florence